Luis Hernán Pérez Ramírez (born 17 April 1965) is a former Chilean footballer and current manager.

Playing career
Pérez had a prolific career as football player in the Chilean football, in addition to a step with Atlético Morelia in Mexico. He retired in 2011 after playing for Deportes Melipilla.

At international level, he represented Chile in the 1984 Summer Olympics. At senior level, he earned 6 caps for the Chile national team between 1989 and 1996.

Coaching career
Pérez has worked as head of technical staff of the Colo-Colo youth system as well as the interim coach of the first team. From 2013 to 2014 he worked as the coach of Deportes La Serena in the Primera B.

Personal life
He is the cousin of the Chilean former professional footballer , who represented Chile in the 1984 CONMEBOL Pre-Olympic Tournament.

Honours
Universidad Católica
 Primera División de Chile (1): 1987, 1997 Apertura

Colo-Colo
 Primera División de Chile (1): 1991
 Copa Libertadores (1): 1991

Chile
 Copa Expedito Teixeira: 1990

References

External links
 
 
 Ceroacero Profile
 

1965 births
Living people
Chilean footballers
Footballers from Santiago
Chilean expatriate footballers
Chile international footballers
Chile youth international footballers
Olympic footballers of Chile
Footballers at the 1984 Summer Olympics
Deportes Magallanes footballers
Club Deportivo Universidad Católica footballers
Colo-Colo footballers
Atlético Morelia players
Deportes Temuco footballers
Santiago Morning footballers
Club Deportivo Palestino footballers
Magallanes footballers
Deportes Melipilla footballers
Chilean Primera División players
Liga MX players
Primera B de Chile players
Copa Libertadores-winning players
Chilean expatriate sportspeople in Mexico
Expatriate footballers in Mexico
Association football midfielders
Association football forwards
Chilean football managers
Colo-Colo managers
Deportes La Serena managers
Chilean Primera División managers
Primera B de Chile managers
Segunda División Profesional de Chile managers